El Tigre is an island located in the Gulf of Fonseca, a body of water on the Pacific coast of Central America. The island is a conical basaltic stratovolcano and the southernmost volcano in Honduras. It belongs to Valle department.

Three countries, Honduras, El Salvador, and Nicaragua, have a coastline along the Gulf of Fonseca, and all three have been involved in a lengthy dispute over the rights to the gulf and the islands located therewithin.  In 1992, a chamber of the International Court of Justice (ICJ) decided the Land, Island and Maritime Frontier Dispute, of which the gulf dispute was a part.  The ICJ determined that El Salvador, Honduras, and Nicaragua were to share control of the Gulf of Fonseca. El Salvador was awarded the islands of Meanguera and Meanguerita, and Honduras was awarded the island of El Tigre.

See also
 List of lighthouses in Honduras
 List of volcanoes in Honduras
 List of islands of Honduras

References

External links
 

Pacific islands of Honduras
Stratovolcanoes of Honduras
Territorial disputes of Honduras
Territorial disputes of El Salvador
El Salvador–Honduras border
Stratovolcanoes of El Salvador